Arandan (also Romanized as Ārandān and Arandān; also known as Aranan, Arenān, Ārnān, and Randān) is a village in Arandan Rural District, in the Central District of Sanandaj County, Kurdistan Province, Iran. At the 2006 census, its population was 1,570, in 359 families. The village is populated by Kurds.

References 

Towns and villages in Sanandaj County
Kurdish settlements in Kurdistan Province